Aspidodiadema africanum is a species of sea urchin of the family Aspidodiadematidae. Their armour is covered with spines. It is placed in the genus Aspidodiadema and lives in the sea. Aspidodiadema africanum was first scientifically described in 1939 by Ole Theodor Jensen Mortensen, a Danish scientist.

See also 
 Argopatagus planus
 Argopatagus vitreus
 Aspidodiadema annulatum

References 

africanum
Animals described in 1939
Taxa named by Ole Theodor Jensen Mortensen